Al Weisbecker (March 29, 1931 – May 22, 2017) was an American football player and coach. He served as the head football coach at Dakota State University in Madison, South Dakota in 1984 and at Black Hills State University in Spearfish, South Dakota from 1986 to 1989, compiling a career college football coaching record of 16–28.

Head coaching record

References

External links
 Northern State Hall of Fame profile

1931 births
2017 deaths
American football halfbacks
Black Hills State Yellow Jackets football coaches
Dakota State Trojans football coaches
Northern State Wolves football players
High school football coaches in South Dakota
People from Aberdeen, South Dakota
Players of American football from South Dakota
People from Madison, South Dakota